Finliandsky Guard Regiment was a Russian Imperial Guard infantry regiment.

Campaigns 
  1807–1813 – Napoleonic Wars
 1828–1829 – Russo-Turkish War
 1831 – Polish campaign.
 1863–1864 – Polish campaign.
 1877–1878 – Russo-Turkish War.
 1914–1917 – First World War. (Eastern Front)

See also
 Finnish Rifle Battalion

References

Sources 
 Gorokhoff, Gerard. Russian Imperial Guard. 2002.
 Handbook of the Russian Army 1914 by the British General Staff. Battery Press reprint edition, 1996.

Russian Imperial Guard
Infantry regiments of the Russian Empire
Military history of Finland
Guards regiments of the Russian Empire